Tihamér Margitay (1859–1922) was a Hungarian painter. He was born in Jenke, Austria-Hungary, (today Jenkovice, Slovakia). He painted anecdotic, so-called "parlour pictures", in the style of Jules Bastien-Lepage.

Background
Margitay studied in Budapest as a student of Gyula Benczúr and in Munich with O.Seitz. He also studied in Venice and Florence. Margitay liked to paint scenes of the middle-class in the style of Bastien-Lepage with a naturalistic technique. His paintings have been exhibited several times in Budapest and also in Vienna. The Hungarian National Gallery are in possession of some of his paintings and his self-portrait is on exhibition at the Hungarian Historical Gallery.

Gallery

References

Művészeti Lexikon, Akadémiai Kiadó, 1980

1859 births
1922 deaths
People from Sobrance District
19th-century Hungarian painters
20th-century Hungarian painters
1922 suicides
Suicides in Hungary